Rainer Salzgeber (born April 26, 1967 in Schruns) is a retired Austrian alpine skier. He has served as Race Department Director for Head since 2002. He is married to fellow former alpine skier Anita Wachter.

References

External links
 
 

Austrian male alpine skiers
Olympic alpine skiers of Austria
Alpine skiers at the 1992 Winter Olympics
Alpine skiers at the 1994 Winter Olympics
1967 births
Living people
People from Bludenz District
Sportspeople from Vorarlberg